Dog Wizard is a fantasy novel by Barbara Hambly and published by Del Rey Books in February, 1993.  The book was a 1994 Locus Award nominee,<ref>1994 Locus SF Awards  Locus Mag.com</ref> and the third book of the Windrose Chronicles.

Synopsis
The story opens with the exiled wizard Antryg Windrose and his companion Joanna living in California after their escape through the void to Earth, after being condemned to death in the previous book, The Silicon Mage''.

The story continues as Joanna is kidnapped from her apartment by a mysterious person wearing the robes of a mage.  Antryg is forced to respond to the call of the wizards who condemned them in order to track her whereabouts. After he arrives at the Citadel of Wizards, he realizes that he was brought there for a completely different reason, and that the wizards have no idea where Joanna is or who kidnapped her.

Footnotes

1993 American novels
American fantasy novels
Novels by Barbara Hambly
Del Rey books